The 241st Independent Brigade of the Territorial Defense Forces is a military formation of the Territorial Defense Forces of Ukraine in Kyiv. It is part of Operational Command North.

History

Formation 
In April 2022 the brigade was formed in Kyiv.

Battalions 130, 204, 205, 206, 207 came from 112th Kyiv City Defense Brigade which grew too large, numbering at least 11 battalions. 243rd Battalion came from 14th Kyiv Oblast Defense Brigade. Colonel Pisotskyi Eduard military call sign "Kovalskyi" became its commander, having previously commanded 131st Territorial Defense Battalion of the 112th Kyiv City Defense Brigade.

130th Territorial Defense Battalion already existed in Solomianskyi District during 2021 when it was part of the 112th Kyiv City Defense Brigade and was actively training soldiers.

207th Territorial Defense Battalion began forming in January and was formed on 27 February 2022. It was commanded by Yushko Viktor.

243rd Territorial Defense Battalion was formed from soldiers of other battalions who took part in the defense of Kyiv.

Russo-Ukrainian War

2022 Russian invasion of Ukraine
130th Territorial Defense Battalion took part in defense of Zhuliany Airport. Later the battalion was involved in Battle of Irpin. After helping liberate Kyiv Oblast, battalion moved on to Kharkiv Oblast. on or about 11 September battalion liberated Hoptivka. Battalion lost 18 soldiers while fighting in Kharkiv Oblast. By the end of 2022 battalion was fighting near Bilohorivka, Luhansk Oblast.

204th Territorial Defense Battalion fought in Battle of Bakhmut during December. As of February 2023 battalion along with 205th and 206 was still in Bakhmut. Ministry of Defence of the Russian Federation on 29 August 2022 claimed that 204th battalion sustained over 60% casualties.

205th Territorial Defense Battalion fought in Battle of Sievierodonetsk, then it was stationed near Sloviansk.

206th Territorial Defense Battalion fought near Mykolaiv in August. Later it was stationed near Vovchansk in January 2023, then it was sent to Bakhmut.

Ministry of Defence of the Russian Federation on 17 July 2022 claimed that 242nd Battalions command posts was destroyed near Derhachi.

243rd Battalion fought in Opytne and Klishchiivka near Bakhmut.

In November brigade commander Colonel Pisotskyi Eduard announced that close to half of his brigade was deployed in north to border with Belarus, Kharkiv Oblast, Kherson Oblast and Mykolaiv Oblast.

Mobile air defense units are stationed near Kyiv, destroying enemy drones which try to attack critical infrastructure of the capital.

Structure 
As of 2022 the brigade's structure is as follows:
 Headquarters
  130th Territorial Defense Battalion (Solomianskyi District)  А7296
  204th Territorial Defense Battalion (Holosiivskyi District)  А7373
  205th Territorial Defense Battalion (Pecherskyi District)  А7374
  206th Territorial Defense Battalion (Podilskyi District)  А7375
 207th Territorial Defense Battalion (Shevchenkivskyi District)  А7376
  242nd Territorial Defense Battalion (Holosiivskyi District)
 243rd Territorial Defense Battalion (Solomianskyi District)  А4247
  251st Territorial Defense Battalion  А4643
 Counter-Sabotage Company
 Engineering Company
 Communication Company
 Logistics Company
 Mortar Battery

Commanders 
 Colonel Pisotskyi Eduard military call sign "Kovalskyi" 2022 - present

Notable members 
 Taras Topolia, leader of musical group Antytila
 Yurii Hudymenko, politician, leader of Democratic Axe party
 Yurii Biriukov, volunteer, former advisor to President Petro Poroshenko
 Akhtem Seitablayev, actor, screenwriter and film director of the Crimean Tatars origin
 Yuriy Lutsenko, former Prosecutor General of Ukraine and Minister of Internal Affairs
 Taras Kompanichenko, folk musician

See also 
 Territorial Defense Forces of the Armed Forces of Ukraine

References 

Territorial defense Brigades of Ukraine
2022 establishments in Ukraine
Military units and formations established in 2022